Reynald Xavier Comeau (born October 25, 1948) is a retired professional ice hockey forward who played 564 games in the National Hockey League between 1972 and 1980. He played for the Montreal Canadiens, Atlanta Flames, and Colorado Rockies.

Regular season and playoffs

External links
 

1948 births
Living people
Atlanta Flames players
Canadian ice hockey centres
Cleveland Barons (1937–1973) players
Colorado Rockies (NHL) players
Fort Worth Texans players
Houston Apollos players
Ice hockey people from Montreal
Montreal Canadiens players
Montreal Voyageurs players
Nova Scotia Voyageurs players
Verdun Maple Leafs (ice hockey) players